Juan Joyita shown onscreen as Juan Joyita quiere ser Caballero is a Colombian telenovela created by Magda Quintero and broadcast on RCN Televisión in 2001.

Plot 
The story revolves around in the Hacienda La Herradura, a place where a hidden treasure lies, but when a curse is found it would fall on who will find it. One day Juan's father is discovered by Helena while he was finding the treasure, at that moment a curse fell on their family. For confusing facts Juan's father is murdered and Lucrecia's brother, Tomas disappears. 20 years later, Juan (Andrés Suárez) returns to avenge his father's death. But he learns that Tomás, Lucrecia's brother is still missing. So he decides to usurp the identity of Tomás to start his revenge against the Caballero family, but everything becomes even more confusing because we must choose between revenge and love for Lucrecia (Catalina Londoño).

Cast 
 Catalina Londoño as Lucrecia "Lucas" Caballero
 Andrés Suárez as Juan Ventura / Tomás Caballero
 Consuelo Luzardo as Helena Caballero
 Diego Cadavid as Roberto
 Alejandro López as Marcelo Villa Caballero
 Pablo Uribe as Tomás Caballero

References

External links 
 

2001 telenovelas
Colombian telenovelas
Spanish-language telenovelas
2001 Colombian television series debuts
2002 Colombian television series endings
RCN Televisión telenovelas